22R-Hydroxycholesterol, or (3β)-cholest-5-ene-3,22-diol is an endogenous, metabolic intermediate in the biosynthesis of the steroid hormones from cholesterol. Cholesterol ((3β)-cholest-5-en-3-ol) is hydroxylated by cholesterol side-chain cleavage enzyme (P450scc) to form 22R-hydroxycholesterol, which is subsequently hydroxylated again by P450scc to form 20α,22R-dihydroxycholesterol, and finally the bond between carbons 20 and 22 is cleaved by P450scc to form pregnenolone ((3β)-3-hydroxypregn-5-en-20-one), the precursor to the steroid hormones.

It is an agonist of the liver X receptor.

See also
 20α,22R-Dihydroxycholesterol
 27-Hydroxycholesterol

References

Cholestanes
Sterols